The 19th South American Youth Championships in Athletics were held in Lima, Perú from November 29–30, 2008.  A detailed report on the results was given.

Medal summary
Medal winners are published.
Complete results can be found on the "World Junior Athletics History"
website.

Men

Women

Medal table (unofficial)

Participation (unofficial)
Detailed result lists can be found on the "World Junior Athletics History"
website. An unofficial count yields the number of about 256
athletes from about 12 countries: 

 (32)
 (11)
 (64)
 (45)
 (13)
 (1)
 (2)
 Panamá (7)
 (7)
 Perú (46)
 (5)
 (23)

References

External links
World Junior Athletics History

South American U18 Championships in Athletics
2008 in Peruvian sport
South American U18
International athletics competitions hosted by Peru
2008 in youth sport